Taymuraz (Teymuraz) Apkhazava (born 21 April 1955) is a Soviet former Greco-Roman wrestler, and Olympic gold medalist. He started to train in 1969, and took part in nine USSR championships and won some international tournaments.

Sport results 
 Greco-Roman Wrestling at 1979 Soviet Spartakiad - ;
 1979 USSR Greco-Roman Wrestling championship - ;
 1980 USSR Greco-Roman Wrestling championship - ;
 1982 USSR Greco-Roman Wrestling championship - ;
 1984 USSR Greco-Roman Wrestling championship - ;
 1986 USSR Greco-Roman Wrestling championship - ;
 Greco-Roman Wrestling at 1983 Soviet Spartakiad - ;

External links 
 

Soviet male sport wrestlers
Living people
1955 births
Sportspeople from Kutaisi
Male sport wrestlers from Georgia (country)
World Wrestling Championships medalists
European Wrestling Champions
Medalists at the 1981 Summer Universiade